Nyiko Sydney Mobbie (born 11 September 1994) is a South African professional soccer player who plays as a right back for Sekhukhune United, on loan from Mamelodi Sundowns, and the South African national team.

Club career

Free State Stars
Born in Xikundu, Malamulele, South Africa, After playing amateur football for local side FC Basel, he joined Free State Stars in 2014. He made his debut on 11 May 2016 in a 2–2 draw at home to Kaizer Chiefs. He scored once in 58 appearances before the club were relegated to the National First Division in 2019.

Mamelodi Sundowns
Following Free State Stars' relegation, Mobbie signed for Mamelodi Sundowns in summer 2019. However, Mobbie was left out of the club's pre-season training camp and signed for Stellenbosch on a season-long loan in August. He scored once in 27 league appearances for Stellenbosch. In December 2020, Mobbie joined Chippa United on loan until the end of the season. He made 20 league appearances for Chippa United. On 9 September 2021, it was announced that Mobbie had joined Sekhukhune United on a season-long loan, with the deal having been completed a week before.

International career
Mobbie made his debut for the South African national team on 4 August 2019 in a 3–0 2020 African Nations Championship qualification defeat to Lesotho. He made 5 appearances at the 2021 COSAFA Cup tournament, which South Africa won after beating Senegal in the final.

Career statistics

International
As of match played on 14 November 2021.

References

1994 births
Living people
South African soccer players
People from Collins Chabane Local Municipality
Sportspeople from Limpopo
Association football fullbacks
Free State Stars F.C. players
Mamelodi Sundowns F.C. players
Stellenbosch F.C. players
Chippa United F.C. players
Sekhukhune United F.C. players
South African Premier Division players
South Africa international soccer players